Zainab Abdulkadir Kure (born 24 November 1959) was elected Senator for the Niger South constituency of Niger State, Nigeria, taking office on 29 May 2007. She is a member of the People's Democratic Party (PDP). She was also adopted as the State  Leader of the party in 2021.  She holds the title of Sagi Raba Nupe.

Life
Kure obtained a BSc in Political Science from Ahmadu Bello University, Zaria in 1984.
She worked as a Civil Servant in Niger State before running for senate, and rose to the position of permanent secretary. Her husband Abdulkadir Kure was Governor of Niger State from 29 May 1999 to 29 May 2007.

As the First Lady in 2000 she introduced an empowerment Program tagged "Project YES" Youth Employment Scheme which targeted Women and Youths as they were trained in various skills and vocation and given a start up pack.

After being elected she was appointed to committees on National Planning, Capital Markets and Agriculture.
In a mid-term evaluation of Senators in May 2009, ThisDay noted that she had sponsored the National Grazing Reserves Establishment and Development Commission Bill, 2008 and the National Poverty Eradication Commission Bill, 2008. The newspaper said she had contributed to debates in plenary, and was focused in committee work.

In 2011, kure advocated for the inclusion of more Women in both appointed and elective positions in Niger State.

In September 2018, Senator David Mark was a Presidential candidate and he appointed Kure as his campaign manager.

In 2012, kure was among the 149 candidate who were shortlisted for National Honors award hosted by the then President of Nigeria Dr Goodluck Jonathan Ebele.

References
6. Our Goal is to Empower Youthshttps://allafrica.com/stories/200212290125.html  All Africa.com . Retrieved 15 February 2023

7. Kure Wants More Political Seats for Womenhttps://www.vanguardngr.com/2010/04/2011-kure-wants-more-political-seats-for-women/amp/ Vanguard Newspaper. Retrieved 15 February 2023

8. Women are better politicians than Menhttps://www.iknowpolitics.org/en/news/world-news/nigeria-women-better-politicians-men-senator-zainab-kure I know Politics. Retrieved 15 February 2023

Living people
1959 births
Nigerian Muslims
Peoples Democratic Party members of the Senate (Nigeria)
People from Niger State
21st-century Nigerian politicians
21st-century Nigerian women politicians